John Williams (9 May 1941 – 17 March 2007) was a New Zealand cricketer. He played six first-class matches for Auckland between 1970 and 1974.

See also
 List of Auckland representative cricketers

References

External links
 

1941 births
2007 deaths
New Zealand cricketers
Auckland cricketers
Cricketers from Gisborne, New Zealand